Parastrapotherium is an extinct genus of South American land mammal that existed from the Late Oligocene (Deseadan SALMA) to the Early Miocene (Colhuehuapian SALMA). The genus includes some of the largest and smallest known astrapotherian, but at present no generally recognized description can adequately characterize it.

Description 

He distinguished it from the Santacrucian (late Early Miocene) Astrapotherium based on the greater number of upper and lower molars. Although later researchers disagreed and concluded that Ameghino based his conclusion on very fragmentary materials, they mostly agreed to distinguish the genus from other groups of astrapotherians.

Species 
The following species have been recognised:
 Parastrapotherium cingulatum 
 Parastrapotherium ephebicum 
 Parastrapotherium holmbergi 
 Parastrapotherium lemoinei 
 Parastrapotherium trouessarti

Distribution 
Fossils of Parastrapotherium have been found in:

Oligocene
 Deseado Formation, Argentina
 Sarmiento Formation, Argentina

Miocene
 Cerro Bandera Formation, Argentina
 Sarmiento Formation, Argentina

References

Bibliography 

 
 
 
 

Meridiungulata
Oligocene mammals of South America
Miocene mammals of South America
Deseadan
Colhuehuapian
Paleogene Argentina
Neogene Argentina
Fossils of Argentina
Fossil taxa described in 1895
Taxa named by Florentino Ameghino
Prehistoric placental genera
Golfo San Jorge Basin
Neuquén Basin
Sarmiento Formation
Cerro Bandera Formation